Trivium is an American heavy metal band from Orlando, Florida. Formed in 1999, the group originally featured bassist and vocalist Brad Lewter, guitarist Jarred Bonaparte, and drummer Travis Smith, who were joined shortly after forming by guitarist Matt Heafy. The band's current line-up features Heafy on guitar and lead vocals, alongside second guitarist Corey Beaulieu (since 2003), bassist Paolo Gregoletto (since 2004), and drummer Alex Bent (since 2017).

History

1999–2006
Trivium was formed in 1999 by Brad Lewter, Jarred Bonaparte and Travis Smith, all of whom were students at Lake Brantley High School. Shortly after the band's formation, 13-year-old Matt Heafy was enlisted as a second guitarist by Lewter, after he saw him perform at a school talent show. Lewter later left the band in 2000 due to differing musical tastes from the other three members, after which Heafy took over as lead vocalist. Trivium subsequently became a four-piece with the addition of guitarist Brent Young, as Bonaparte moved over to the role of bassist. Bonaparte would also later leave the group after choosing to attend college, with Richie Brown taking over on a temporary basis. After Brown's departure, Young took over on bass and Trivium reverted to a three-piece again.

After finalizing their line-up, Trivium signed to Lifeforce Records and recorded their debut album Ember to Inferno. In August 2003, the band briefly recruited The Autumn Offering's George Moore as a second guitarist, although he had left again within a few weeks after his first band signed a record deal. The guitarist spot was later filled long-term by Corey Beaulieu, who officially joined the band that September. In April 2004, the band signed with Roadrunner Records, shortly after which Young left the band (he was replaced for the tour in June by Monstrosity's Mike Poggione). After taking over for Poggione on the tour in August, Paolo Gregoletto was officially announced as Trivium's new bassist and backing vocalist in November 2004. The band released Ascendancy in March 2005.

Since 2006
Trivium kept a consistent line-up for 2006's The Crusade and 2008's Shogun, before Smith was fired from the band in 2010 after choosing not to be involved in the late-2009 tour in order to "take care of some personal business". His initial replacement Nick Augusto was later confirmed as the new full-time drummer for the band. Augusto performed on In Waves (2011) and Vengeance Falls (2013) before he was asked to leave in 2014, with Gregoletto explaining that their relationship with the drummer had "began to fray". Drum technician Mat Madiro took his place, initially on a temporary basis, although he remained for the recording of 2015's Silence in the Snow. Madiro was replaced in December 2015 by Paul Wandtke, who remained in the group for around a year before he was replaced by Alex Bent. 

In October 2018, Heafy announced that he would be unavailable for a string of upcoming dates due to his wife's pregnancy, with Light the Torch frontman Howard Jones, Avatar frontman Johannes Eckerström and YouTube personality Jared Dines taking his place. In September 2020, early Trivium member Brent Young died.

Members

Current

Former

Touring

Timeline

Line-ups

Bibliography

References

External links
Trivium official website

Trivium (band) members
Lists of members by band